Sequoioideae, popularly known as redwoods, is a subfamily of coniferous trees within the family Cupressaceae. It includes the largest and tallest trees in the world.

Description
The three redwood subfamily genera are Sequoia from coastal California and Oregon, Sequoiadendron from California's Sierra Nevada, and Metasequoia in China. The redwood species contains the largest and tallest trees in the world. These trees can live for thousands of years. Threats include logging, fire suppression, climate change, illegal marijuana cultivation, and burl poaching.

Only two of the genera, Sequoia and Sequoiadendron, are known for massive trees. Trees of Metasequoia, from the single living species Metasequoia glyptostroboides, are deciduous, grow much smaller (although are still large compared to most other trees) and can live in colder climates.

Taxonomy and evolution 
Multiple studies of both morphological and molecular characters have strongly supported the assertion that the Sequoioideae are monophyletic.

Most modern phylogenies place Sequoia as sister to Sequoiadendron and Metasequoia as the out-group. However, Yang et al. went on to investigate the origin of a peculiar genetic artifact of the Sequoioideae—the polyploidy of Sequoia—and generated a notable exception that calls into question the specifics of this relative consensus.

Cladistic tree
A 2006 paper based on non-molecular evidence suggested the following relationship among extant species:

A 2021 study using molecular evidence found the same relationships among Sequoioideae species, but found Sequoioideae to be the sister group to the Athrotaxidoideae (a superfamily presently known only from Tasmania) rather than to Taxodioideae. Sequoioideae and Athrotaxidoideae are thought to have diverged from each other during the Jurassic.

Possible reticulate evolution in Sequoioideae 

Reticulate evolution refers to the origination of a taxon through the merging of ancestor lineages.
Polyploidy has come to be understood as quite common in plants—with estimates ranging from 47% to 100% of flowering plants and extant ferns having derived from ancient polyploidy. Within the gymnosperms however it is quite rare. Sequoia sempervirens is hexaploid (2n= 6x= 66). To investigate the origins of this polyploidy Yang et al. used two single copy nuclear genes, LFY and NLY, to generate phylogenetic trees. Other researchers have had success with these genes in similar studies on different taxa.

Several hypotheses have been proposed to explain the origin of Sequoia's polyploidy: allopolyploidy by hybridization between Metasequoia and some probably extinct taxodiaceous plant; Metasequoia and Sequoiadendron, or ancestors of the two genera, as the parental species of Sequoia; and autohexaploidy, autoallohexaploidy, or segmental allohexaploidy.

Yang et al. found that Sequoia was clustered with Metasequoia in the tree generated using the LFY gene but with Sequoiadendron in the tree generated with the NLY gene. Further analysis strongly supported the hypothesis that Sequoia was the result of a hybridization event involving Metasequoia and Sequoiadendron. Thus, Yang et al. hypothesize that the inconsistent relationships among Metasequoia, Sequoia, and Sequoiadendron could be a sign of reticulate evolution by hybrid speciation (in which two species hybridize and give rise to a third) among the three genera. However, the long evolutionary history of the three genera (the earliest fossil remains being from the Jurassic) make resolving the specifics of when and how Sequoia originated once and for all a difficult matter—especially since it in part depends on an incomplete fossil record.

Extant Species

South-central China

California, USA

Paleontology
Sequoioideae is an ancient taxon, with the oldest described Sequoioideae species, Sequoia jeholensis, recovered from Jurassic deposits. A genus Medulloprotaxodioxylon, reported from the late Triassic of China supports the idea of a Norian origin.

The fossil record shows a massive expansion of range in the Cretaceous and dominance of the Arcto-Tertiary Geoflora, especially in northern latitudes. Genera of Sequoioideae were found in the Arctic Circle, Europe, North America, and throughout Asia and Japan. A general cooling trend beginning in the late Eocene and Oligocene reduced the northern ranges of the Sequoioideae, as did subsequent ice ages. Evolutionary adaptations to ancient environments persist in all three species despite changing climate, distribution, and associated flora, especially the specific demands of their reproduction ecology that ultimately forced each of the species into refugial ranges where they could survive.

Conservation
The entire subfamily is endangered. The IUCN Red List Category & Criteria assesses Sequoia sempervirens as Endangered (A2acd), Sequoiadendron giganteum as Endangered (B2ab) and Metasequoia glyptostroboides as Endangered (B1ab).

Introduced range
The two California redwood species, since the early 19th century, and the Chinese redwood species since 1948, have been cultivated horticulturally far beyond their native habitats. They are found in botanical gardens, public parks, and private landscapes in many similar climates worldwide. Plantings outside their native ranges particularly are found in California, the coastal Northwestern and the Eastern United States, areas of China, Ireland, Germany, the United Kingdom, Australia and near Rotorua, New Zealand. They are also used in educational projects recreating the look of the megaflora of the Pleistocene landscape.

See also
 Temperate cloud forest of North America Westcoast (Sequoia forests)
 List of superlative trees

References

Bibliography and links
 
 
 
 
 :de:Liste der dicksten Mammutbäume in Deutschland. List of Large Giant Redwoods in Germany
 IUCN 2013. IUCN Red List of Threatened Species. Version 2013.2. Downloaded on 10 January 2014.

External links 
 

 
Plant subfamilies